Bredfield is a small village and civil parish in the English county of Suffolk. It is situated just off the A12, two miles north of Woodbridge. Another village, Dallinghoo, is to the north, and to the west is Boulge, a small hamlet.  The population of Bredfield at the 2001 census was 308 (including 10 students living outside the village), the population increasing to 340 at the 2011 Census.

The first mention of Bredfield is in Little Domesday in 1086, as Brēde Felda (or various permutations thereof) in Old English, meaning "broad clearing".

The historic building Bredfield House, the birthplace of poet and writer Edward FitzGerald, used to be situated in the village; however, it was damaged during World War II and has since been demolished. There is a historic non-denominational chapel (built in 1902) and a historic parish church (St Andrew's, dating from the 13th century).  The Castle Inn public house has stood in the village since at last 1808 and remains a centre of village social life. The village primary school, which also served surrounding villages, opened in 1853 and closed in 1986, and a number of its former pupils are still resident in the village.

Like many small villages, Bredfield was unable to sustain not only the school but also a privately run grocery shop, the last one also closing in 1986. However, the villagers got together and started a community shop, initially in a portacabin but eventually moving into a purpose-built extension to the village hall.

A further example of the practical expression of the community spirit in the village is the recent establishment of an award-winning Jubilee Meadow conservation area and community orchard, development of which is ongoing.

There are several small businesses in the village, which is surrounded by farmland.

Bredfield is the likely real world location of Dr. Rant/ Mr. Eldred's house who are both characters who appear in the Tractate Middoth a short ghost story by M.R. James first published in More Ghost Stories

References

External links

Bredfield on OneSuffolk.net
Bredfield.org.uk
 http://bredfieldchapel.com

Villages in Suffolk
Civil parishes in Suffolk